The Christian Walls of Madrid, also known as the Medieval Walls, were built in Madrid, Spain between the 11th and 12th centuries, once the city passed to the Crown of Castile. They were built as an extension of the original 9th-century Muslim Walls of Madrid to accommodate the new districts which emerged after the Reconquista (11th–13th centuries).

When Philip II moved his court to Madrid from Valladolid in 1561, the walls fell into disuse and were almost entirely demolished. Some of the remains are still standing, however, and are integrated into the structure of various buildings in El Madrid de los Austrias, a name designating the Habsburgs' historic center of the city.

The remains that are still standing were declared a Historical and Artistic Monument in 1954.

History 

Tradition attributes the construction of the walls to King Alfonso VII of León and Castile (1126–1157), although it is likely that work began before his reign, in the years immediately following the Christian conquest of Madrid (1083). This would date the construction of the walls to the reign of Alfonso VI of León and Castile (1040–1109).

Various municipal documents suggest that they could have been completed in the second decade of the 13th century.

After the Reconquista, in the 14th and 15th centuries, the defensive role the walls played in the Christian reclamation of land and the process of Christian repopulation began to fade.

The remarkable urban growth experienced by Madrid and the development of new suburbs beyond the city walls led to their demolition, particularly after the 16th century, when the city has designated the capital of Spain.

Features 

Unlike the Arab walled enclosure, which was built in quadrangular towers, the Christian structure was articulated from semicircular keep towers on layers of flint. The properties of flint (which, when struck, causes sparks) gave rise to one of the historic city slogans: "I was on water built, my walls are of fire."

It is estimated that there could have been between 130 and 140 towers, one every . The walls were surrounded by an outer moat, which ran along most of the perimeter. These  were built over this pit after it was covered.

The Christian Walls contained four gates, each protected by the proximity of one or more strong towers. These gates, none of which were preserved, were:

 The  was the main gate of the city and the most ornate, given its location in a place of great commercial transit. It was located at the current number 49, Calle Mayor. It consisted of two large towers, across which stretched the entrance arch. In 1535, the emperor Carlos V, Holy Roman Emperor (1500–1558) directed the demolition of the original medieval gate and replaced it with a new one, which consisted of three arches and greater ornamentation. This gate was destroyed in a fire on September 2, 1582.
 The  (alternatively spelled Balnadú) was possibly located at the intersection of  Lepanto, Carlos III, and Vergara, near the Teatro Real.
It was destroyed in 1412 during an uprising.
 The  (closed gate), located in the Plaza de Puerta Cerrada, was initially called Puerta de la Culebra, due to its carved relief of a dragon. The name changed to Cerrada (closed) when it was shut as a result of the frequent crimes and assaults that took place inside. It was flanked by the Tower del Vinagre and was demolished in 1569, on the occasion of the entry into the city of Elisabeth of Valois, wife of Philip II.

Several albarrana towers and watchtowers were built at strategic locations along the walls. These included the Tower de Alzapierna (or de Gaona), which had a mandate to monitor the source of the Caños del Peral fountain (in the current Plaza de Isabel II). The Tower de los Huesos, built in the 11th century during the Muslim occupation of the city, was incorporated into the Christian Walls to protect the Valnadú Gate. The remains of the latter are exhibited in the underground parking lot at the Plaza de Oriente.

Most relevant remains 
The most important remains of the Christian Walls of Madrid are integrated into various buildings and urban infrastructures. In most cases, access is very limited, given the private nature of the apartment blocks where these remains are located:

At numbers 22 and 24 of the same street, a section of foundation and the base of a semicircular keep tower remain. This section stands beside the ruins of a semi-cylindrical keep tower.
It is visible from the street through a barred door.
 Plaza de Puerta Cerrada – the most complete surviving fragment of the wall stands at numbers 4 and 6 of this plaza. The height of this section remains entirely intact. Due to its preservation, the round path and the parapet are visible, as well as the remains of a tower.
 Plaza de Isabel II – at number 3 of this plaza, a stretch of the wall can be seen in the basement of an American restaurant. This section is displayed to the public during the business hours of the establishment. Discovered in 1991, it includes the flint masonry and two brick arches, probably corresponding to a late-medieval renovation of the wall. In 1990, the base of the Tower de Alzapierna was excavated in the current metro station at the plaza, but these remains were later destroyed.
 Calle de la Escalinata – between 1943 and 1945, different remains of a tower and a stretch of the walls were discovered at numbers 9 and 11 of this street, near the Plaza de Isabel II.
 Calle del Mesón de Paños – at numbers 11, 13, and 15, various poorly preserved remains were discovered in 1956.
 Calle de los Mancebos – at numbers 3 and 5 are the remains of a silo with Islamic artifacts. Although this silo forms part of a larger building structure, it can be seen from the street.
At number 10, there are also the remains of a semicircular keep tower and part of the wall.
 Plaza de Oriente – the foundation of the Torre de los Huesos is located here. The tower is of Muslim origin and was later integrated into the Christian Walls. It is exhibited in the underground parking lot at this plaza, which was built in 1996.

Gallery

See also
Walls of Madrid

References

External links 

 
 

Buildings and structures completed in the 12th century
Ruins in Madrid
Walls
Madrid
Bien de Interés Cultural landmarks in the Community of Madrid